Chung Yang-jin (born 6 November 1978) is a South Korean former professional tennis player.

Biography
A right-handed player born in Jochiwon, Chung reached a best singles ranking on the professional tour of 362 in the world and featured in a total of 15 Fed Cup ties for South Korea.

In 2000 she won ITF titles in Jakarta and Seoul.

Chung was a singles bronze medalist for South Korea at the 2001 Summer Universiade in Beijing.

At the 2002 Asian Games in Busan, Chung was a member of the bronze medal winning South Korean team.

ITF Finals

Singles (2–5)

Doubles (1–3)

References

External links
 
 
 

1978 births
Living people
South Korean female tennis players
Universiade medalists in tennis
Asian Games medalists in tennis
Asian Games bronze medalists for South Korea
Medalists at the 2002 Asian Games
Tennis players at the 2002 Asian Games
Universiade bronze medalists for South Korea
Medalists at the 2001 Summer Universiade
21st-century South Korean women